Ornduffia reniformis, also known as the running marsh-flower, is a species of plant in the Menyanthaceae family of wetland plants that is endemic to Australia.

Description
The species is an emergent, aquatic, perennial herb that grows to a height of 1.3 m. It has round to reniform (kidney-shaped), glossy green, floating leaves 3–12 mm across. The yellow flowers, which appear on erect panicles from October to March, are 6.5–12 mm long and 19–43 mm in diameter. The seed capsules are 6–12 mm long, with fruiting taking place mainly from October to April.

Distribution and habitat
The range of the species includes parts of Queensland, New South Wales, South Australia, Victoria and Tasmania, where it inhabits freshwater wetlands, including temporarily flooded depressions.

References

reniformis
Asterales of Australia
Flora of New South Wales
Flora of Queensland
Flora of South Australia
Flora of Tasmania
Flora of Victoria (Australia)
Taxa named by Robert Brown (botanist, born 1773)
Plants described in 1810